Alton is a national park in the Balonne Shire local government area of South West Queensland, Australia.

Geography 
Alton National Park is 371 km west of Brisbane and 75 km east of St George, adjacent to Moonie Highway. The park is divided by the Moonie Highway and surrounded by grazing properties. The average elevation of the terrain is 225 meters.

History 
Alton National Park was declared in 1973. The area was preserved because it contains vegetation of limited occurrence, interesting plant species and attractive wildflowers.  A total of four rare or threatened species have been identified within Alton. It is also home to 191 different species of animals.

Amenities 
Alton has tourist potential, although at the moment visitors must be self-reliant. The park has no facilities for campers.

See also
 Protected areas of Queensland

References

National parks of Queensland
1973 establishments in Australia
Protected areas established in 1973
South West Queensland